The Ouachita Railroad Company  is a short-line railroad headquartered in El Dorado, Arkansas, United States.

OUCH operates a 26.2 mile line in Arkansas and Louisiana from El Dorado (where it interchanges with Union Pacific) to Lillie, Louisiana. Only the part from El Dorado to a plant south of town is in service.

OUCH traffic generally consists of lumber, chemicals, and particleboard.

The line was formerly part of the Chicago, Rock Island and Pacific Railroad until its liquidation.  The line was then operated by the South Central Arkansas Railway from 1982-1983, when it was sold to the East Camden and Highland Railroad (EACH).  EACH sold the line to Arkansas Shortline Railroads, Inc., a short-line railroad holding company, in 1990.

References

External links

Link to Union Pacific Website with OUCH Details

Arkansas railroads
Louisiana railroads
El Dorado, Arkansas
Transportation in Union County, Arkansas
Transportation in Union Parish, Louisiana
Railway companies established in 1982
1982 establishments in Arkansas